Arthur Richard Lindfors (17 March 1893 – 21 September 1977) was a Finnish wrestler and Olympic medalist in Greco-Roman wrestling.

Olympics
Lindfors competed at the 1920 Summer Olympics in Antwerp where he received a silver medal in Greco-Roman wrestling, the middleweight class. He received a second silver medal at the 1924 Summer Olympics in Paris.

References

External links
 

1893 births
1977 deaths
Olympic wrestlers of Finland
Wrestlers at the 1920 Summer Olympics
Wrestlers at the 1924 Summer Olympics
Finnish male sport wrestlers
Olympic silver medalists for Finland
Olympic medalists in wrestling
Medalists at the 1920 Summer Olympics
Medalists at the 1924 Summer Olympics
People from Porvoo
Sportspeople from Uusimaa
19th-century Finnish people
20th-century Finnish people